Lonnie "LeeRoy" Yarbrough (September 17, 1938 – December 7, 1984) was an American stock car racer. His best season was 1969 when he won seven races, tallied 21 finishes in the top-ten and earned $193,211 ($ when inflation is taken into account). During his entire career from 1960–1972, he competed in 198 races, scoring fourteen wins, 65 finishes in the top-five, 92 finishes in the top-ten, and ten pole positions. Yarbrough also competed in open-wheel racing, making 5 starts in the USAC Championship cars, including 3 Indianapolis 500s, with a best finish of 3rd at Trenton Speedway in 1970. His racing number was 98. When asked about his passion, Yarbrough described racing as "what I call my life."

Yarbrough was admitted to a mental institution on March 7, 1980 after trying to kill his mother by strangulation. All attempts to rehabilitate him (both in Florida or in North Carolina) failed and LeeRoy eventually died in 1984 after a fall. In 1990, he was inducted into the National Motorsports Press Association's Hall of Fame at Darlington Raceway in South Carolina. LeeRoy Yarbrough is not related to NASCAR champion Cale Yarborough.

Career

Early stock car career
Yarbrough grew up on the west side of Jacksonville, Florida, and developed an affinity for speed at an early age. When he was sixteen years-old, Yarbrough put together his first car, a 1934 Ford coupe with a Chrysler engine. When he was 19, Yarbrough found his way to a local dirt track. He won that race at Jacksonville Speedway in the spring of 1957.  Racing at Jacksonville Speedway Park on Saturday nights Yarborough developed a penchant for carrying excess speed into the third turn and diving under any car that was ahead of him.  He would then slide through the turn and run the straightway 1" from the concrete wall.  The style was evident in many of his last lap wins throughout his career.

Yarbrough started his racing career in NASCAR's lower tier Sportsman division. After winning 11 races, Yarbrough moved up to the more powerful Modifieds and won 83 features in a three-year span.

Yarbrough won two short-track races in the 1964 NASCAR Grand National season, the first year he competed in more than 14 races. Two years later, Yarbrough scored his first superspeedway win at Charlotte. Factory-backed rides followed. His Junior Johnson-owned Ford team started out poorly early in the 1968 season. LeeRoy rebounded and won at Atlanta and Trenton.

1969 and later
In the 1969 Daytona 500, Yarbrough found himself trailing Charlie Glotzbach by 11 seconds with ten laps remaining. On the final lap, Yarbrough ducked to the low side to make the pass, but a lapped car was in that lane. Yarbrough dived to the low side in turn 3 to clear the lapped car, nearly clipping the apron. He took the lead from Glotzbach and dashed under the checkered flag a car length in front to win the Daytona 500. Next, he won Darlington's Rebel 400 in the final four laps, then won Charlotte's World 600, lapping the entire field at least twice. He also bagged the summer 400-miler at Daytona, prevailing in a late-race battle with Buddy Baker, making him the third driver in NASCAR history to sweep both Daytona races. Yarbrough won the summer race at Atlanta International Raceway despite a 102-degree fever. He captured The Southern 500 by passing David Pearson on the last lap. He won by a full lap at Rockingham in October, overcoming a lap deficit when a flat tire sent him into the wall.   By season's end, Yarbrough had seven wins to his credit and was named American Driver of The year.

After his successful 1969 season, Yarbrough’s performance record trailed off. A victim of the factory withdrawal, Yarbrough had to scramble to locate rides in Grand National events. He won once in 1970 at Charlotte Motor Speedway, and only entered six races in 1971. In 1972, he accepted a ride in a Ford owned by independent campaigner Bill Seifert. He registered nine top 10 finishes in 18 starts. Yarbrough showed up for Daytona's 1973 Speedweeks, but failed to earn a starting berth for the Daytona 500. He virtually dropped out of sight after that, never again showing up at a NASCAR event.

Later career and life

A hard test crash, April 1970, at the old Texas World Speedway in College Station, Texas left him disoriented. He could not remember fellow driver Cale Yarborough picking him up in Texas a few days later and flying him home. He also could not remember flying on to Martinsville, or running in the race at Martinsville.

Junior Johnson, who considered him the best driver he ever had, was determined to find out what was wrong. "He could remember everything from 1970 back, nothing forward," Johnson said. "And, it seemed like it just happened all at once. You'd go to dinner with him, and they'd put a plate of food in front of him, and he'd just sit, and look at it, until you said, 'Lee Roy, eat.' Then, he’d pick up his knife and fork." 

Yarbrough showed well in a few Indy Car starts, leading the inaugural California 500 at Ontario Motor Speedway late before dropping out, and then finishing 3rd at Trenton Speedway in 1971. After competing in 3 Indianapolis 500s in 1967, '69 and '70, Yarbrough was driving a Dan Gurney Eagle in practice for the 1971 500 when he spun and crashed hard in turn one. Yarbrough spent the next few months, June through November, in and out of the hospital with many different ailments and memory problems. He was rumoured to have contracted Rocky Mountain spotted fever from a tick bite, and also drank alcohol heavily. He most likely suffered brain trauma from the crashes in Texas and Indianapolis. Many drivers would have different theories on the cause of Yarbrough's declining mental health, one example being Ray Fox saying “Racing happened to Lee Roy. Just too many crashes. And they sent him off the deep end.” James Hylton would blame “that doggone tick. The Rocky Mountain spotted fever—if it goes untreated, it’s a mental thing, and it’ll drive you insane. They gave Lee Roy so much medication when they finally did treat it that it eventually caused his death. He just deteriorated to the point where he was unmanageable. The man did not deserve that. Lee Roy was one of the good ones.”

On a Thursday evening in February 1980, Yarbrough and his mother, Minnie were watching TV together when out of nowhere, Yarbrough would say "Mother, I hate to do this to you." Minnie replied, "What do you mean?" Yarbrough would proceed to strangle his mother, who was only saved by a nephew who had heard the screams and hit Yarbrough with a jelly jar on the head. A few minutes later, police arrested Yarbrough with charges of first-degree attempted murder for trying to kill his 65-year-old mother, plus assault on a police officer. Yarbrough was committed to the Florida State Hospital at Chattahoochee by Judge Hudson Oliff of Jacksonville on March 7, 1980, after he was tried for attempted first-degree murder of his mother and battery to a law-enforcement officer. His mother, Minnie Yarbrough, testified that he had walked up to her and started strangling her for no reason. Judge Oliff ruled that Mr. Yarbrough was not guilty of attempted murder because he was unable to distinguish right from wrong at the time of the incident.

Death
While in the hospital on December 6, 1984, Yarbrough had a violent seizure and fell over striking his head. He fell unconscious immediately. He was rushed to Jacksonville's University Hospital where he died the morning of December 7, 1984. The doctors said he died of internal bleeding in the brain.

Motorsports career results

American open-wheel racing
(key) (Races in bold indicate pole position)

USAC Championship Car

Indianapolis 500

NASCAR
(key) (Bold – Pole position awarded by qualifying time. Italics – Pole position earned by points standings or practice time. * – Most laps led. ** – All laps led.)

Grand National Series

Winston Cup Series

Daytona 500

Grand National East Series

References

External links
 

1938 births
1984 deaths
Burials in Florida
Indianapolis 500 drivers
NASCAR drivers
Racing drivers from Florida
Racing drivers from Jacksonville, Florida
Sportspeople from Jacksonville, Florida